Tarnol is a small town located about  north-west of Islamabad.
The primary language of the area is Punjabi and Pashto. Most residents work in the heavy machinery and stone-crushing trades. Most of the population commute to Islamabad or Rawalpindi for work.

Tarnol is part of NA-54 and UC-47.

This area has strategic importance due to being near the new Islamabad International Airport which is bringing investment to the area.

References

Union councils of Islamabad Capital Territory
Villages in Islamabad Capital Territory